Chronicle of the Years of Fire (these names both mean "Chronicle of the Years of Embers") is a 1975 Algerian drama historical film directed by Mohammed Lakhdar-Hamina. It depicts the Algerian War of Independence as seen through the eyes of a peasant.

The film won the Palme d'Or prize at the 1975 Cannes Film Festival. It was also selected as the Algerian entry for the Best Foreign Language Film at the 48th Academy Awards, but was not accepted as a nominee.

Cast
 Yorgo Voyagis - Ahmed
 Mohammed Lakhdar-Hamina - Le conteur fou
 Hadj Smaine Mohamed Seghir - Sage du village
 Leila Shenna - La femme
 Cheikh Nourredine - L'ami
 François Maistre - Le contremaître de la carrière

See also
 List of submissions to the 48th Academy Awards for Best Foreign Language Film
 List of Algerian submissions for the Academy Award for Best Foreign Language Film
 The Battle of Algiers, 1966 classic docudrama on Algerian War
 Lost Command, a commercial film on the Algerian War of Independence and Indochine War
 Lion of the Desert, a similar movie about Omar Mukhtar's Libyan resistance against Italian occupation

References

External links

1975 films
Palme d'Or winners
1970s Arabic-language films
1970s French-language films
Algerian drama films
War epic films
Algerian War films
1970s war drama films
Films directed by Mohammed Lakhdar-Hamina
1975 drama films
1975 multilingual films
Algerian multilingual films